Eden Atwood is an American jazz singer and actress. She is the daughter of composer Hubbard Atwood and the granddaughter of the novelist A. B. Guthrie Jr.

Career
Atwood was born in Memphis, Tennessee. When she was five, her parents got a divorce, and she moved with her mother to Montana. Her mother's father was novelist A. B. Guthrie Jr. Her father, Hubbard Atwood, was a composer and arranger who wrote the songs "Tell Me About Yourself" for Nat King Cole, "I Was the Last One to Know" for Stan Kenton, and "No One Ever Tells You" for Frank Sinatra. She took piano lessons, and she sang in a rock band in high school but quit due to damage to her vocal chords. She went to the University of Montana, where she concentrated on musical theater and drama. For six months, she attended the American Conservatory of Music in Chicago. She gave a demo tape to a bar owner in Chicago, and after hearing her he made her the headliner.

In 1992, Atwood had recurring roles on the soap opera Loving and the crime drama The Commish. At the same time, she began singing in clubs in New York City. Marian McPartland, a pianist and radio host, heard a copy of Atwood's debut album, Today! (1992), which was independently produced during the previous year. McPartland sent a copy to Concord Records, which then made Atwood one of the youngest musicians to sign a contract with Concord. The debut album was reissued under the name No One Ever Tells You.

As of 2022 she is a psychotherapist who conducts psychodynamic/relational therapy, cognitive behavioral therapy, motivational interviewing and narrative therapy.

AIS
Atwood was born with Androgen Insensitivity Syndrome (AIS), an intersex trait occurring in approximately 1 in 20,000 people. In a person with complete AIS, the body's cells are unable to respond to androgens,  male hormones. She discussed AIS for the first time publicly with Bill Kohlhaase in the liner notes for her 2002 album, Waves: The Bossa Nova Session. In 2008, she was featured on ABC's Primetime Live.

Atwood is a co-founder of The Interface Project, a project that shares stories of people born with intersex conditions.

Discography 
 Today! (Southport, 1992)
 No One Ever Tells You (Concord Jazz, 1993)
 Cat on a Hot Tin Roof (Concord Jazz, 1994)
 There Again (Concord Jazz, 1995)
 A Night in the Life (Concord Jazz, 1996)
 My Ideal (Sangaji Music, 2000)
 Waves: The Bossa Nova Session (Groove Note, 2002)
 Wild Women Don't Get the Blues (Eden Atwood & Last Best Band, 2002)
 Feels Like Home (Eden Atwood & Last Best Band, 2003)
 This Is Always: The Ballad Session (Groove Note, 2004)
 Turn Me Loose (SSJ, 2009)
 Like Someone in Love (SSJ, 2010)
 Angel Eyes (SSJ, 2012)

Filmography

References

External links
Eden Atwood at IMDB
Eden Atwood official site (archived)

1969 births
Living people
Actresses from Memphis, Tennessee
Intersex women
Intersex rights activists
Intersex rights in the United States
American women jazz singers
American jazz singers
Jazz musicians from Tennessee
21st-century American women
Intersex actors
Intersex musicians